Qu Bo (born 15 July 1981) is a Chinese retired footballer.

Club career
Qu Bo started his football career playing for Tianjin Locomotive's youth team where he was spotted by and then transferred to top-tier side Qingdao in 2000. He would quickly establish himself as an exciting young player and go on to play in seventeen league games while scoring eight goals, which would be enough to personally win the Chinese Football Association Young Player of the Year award at the end of the 2000 league season. Qu would continue to be a vital member of the team and after playing in the 2002 FIFA World Cup where he would draw considerable interest from Premier League club Tottenham Hotspur where he had a month-long stint with them before leaving due to the lack of a work permit. On his return to Qingdao, he would show his importance to the team by helping the team win the club's first ever Chinese FA Cup at the end of the 2002 league season.

On 22 February 2010, after spending ten years at Qingdao, Qu transferred to top-tier side Shaanxi Chanba. He soon made his debut for the club in a league game against Dalian Shide on 28 March 2010 in a 1–1 draw. After waiting several months, he would eventually score his first goal for the club on 14 July 2010 in a 2–1 win against Shanghai Shenhua. At the beginning of the 2012 season, Qu followed the club when it decided to move to Guizhou and rename themselves Guizhou Renhe.

On 3 June 2014, Qu transferred to China League One side Qingdao Hainiu. He made his debut for the club on 19 July 2014 in a 4–1 loss to Shijiazhuang Yongchang and scored his first goal for the club on 27 July 2014 in a 2–1 win against Chengdu Tiancheng.

On 5 January 2016, Qu transferred to his hometown club Tianjin Teda in the Chinese Super League. He announced his retirement on 2 March 2017.

International career
Qu's lightning pace first caught the eye of many at the 2000 AFC Youth Championship where he scored four goals for his country. After playing in the 2001 FIFA World Youth Championship, he would quickly catch the attention of Bora Milutinovic who included him into the 2002 FIFA World Cup squad where he preferred to place Qu at the wing so he can get the best out of the young prospect's pace. Following his initial rise to the national team, Qu had difficulty in retaining his position as a consistent member of the team. He was not selected for the 2004 AFC Asian Cup squad and was forced out with injury in the 2007 AFC Asian Cup squad. He was however brought back to the national team for several qualifying games and worked his way back into the side. He represented China for the final time in 2013.

Career statistics

International goals
Results list China's goal tally first.

Honours

Club
Qingdao Jonoon
 Chinese FA Cup: 2002

Guizhou Renhe
 Chinese FA Cup: 2013
 Chinese FA Super Cup: 2014

International
China PR national football team
 East Asian Football Championship: 2010

Individual
 Chinese Football Association Young Player of the Year: 2000
Chinese Super League Team of the Year: 2009

Personal life
Qu Bo and Zhu Yanxiang married on 11 November 2011. On 26 January 2014, they had a boy named Qu Jiahe.

References

External links
chinasuperleague.com 2002 China Team Player Profile at Sinosoc website

news.bbc.co.uk 2002 World Cup Player Profile at BBC website

football-lineups.com Player stats at football-lineups website

1981 births
Living people
Chinese footballers
Footballers from Tianjin
China international footballers
2002 FIFA World Cup players
2011 AFC Asian Cup players
Qingdao Hainiu F.C. (1990) players
Beijing Renhe F.C. players
Qingdao F.C. players
Tianjin Jinmen Tiger F.C. players
Chinese Super League players
China League One players
Association football forwards
Association football wingers
Footballers at the 2002 Asian Games
Asian Games competitors for China